Radoje Đerić (born 28 December 1991 in Trebinje) is a Serbian rower. He represented Serbia at the 2012 Summer Olympics.
He is the older brother of rower Igor Đerić. He currently lives in Belgrade.

Results

Olympic games
 2012 - Coxless four - 10th place

World Championship
 2011 - Coxless four - 11th place

European Championship
 2010 - Coxless four - 6th place
 2011 - Coxless four - 6th place
 2012 - Coxless four -

World U23 Championships
 2013 - Coxless pair -

World Junior Championship
 2008 - Quadruple scull - 4th place
 2009 - Double sculls - 5th place

References

1991 births
Living people
Serbian male rowers
Olympic rowers of Serbia
Rowers at the 2012 Summer Olympics
European Rowing Championships medalists
21st-century Serbian people